Guido Cantini (9 April 1889 – 1 January 1945) was an Italian playwright and screenwriter.

Selected filmography
 The Wedding March (1934)
 The Carnival Is Here Again (1937)
 The Dream of Butterfly (1939)
 Eternal Melodies (1940)
 Antonio Meucci (1940)
 Manon Lescaut (1940)
 Beyond Love (1940)
 Love Me, Alfredo! (1940)
 Disturbance (1942)
 La signorina (1942)
 The Two Orphans (1942)
 Maria Malibran (1943)

References

Bibliography
 Mancini, Elaine. Struggles of the Italian film industry during fascism, 1930-1935. UMI Research Press, 1985.

External links

1889 births
1945 deaths
20th-century Italian screenwriters
People from Livorno